Jimmy Connors was the defending champion but did not compete that year.

Vitas Gerulaitis won in the final 6–3, 6–2, 6–1 against Eddie Dibbs.

Seeds
A champion seed is indicated in bold text while text in italics indicates the round in which that seed was eliminated.

  Björn Borg (semifinals, withdrew)
  Brian Gottfried (quarterfinals)
  Vitas Gerulaitis (champion)
  Ilie Năstase (quarterfinals)
  Eddie Dibbs (final)
  Raúl Ramirez (quarterfinals)
  Corrado Barazzutti (semifinals)
  Dick Stockton (quarterfinals)

Draw

References
1978 World Championship Tennis Finals Draw (Archived 2009-05-06)

Singles